The 2010 GP3 Series season was the first season of the GP3 Series, a feeder series for the GP2 Series. The championship was contested over sixteen races held at eight rounds, beginning on 8 May at Circuit de Catalunya and ending on 12 September at Autodromo Nazionale Monza. Ten teams were announced, running three cars each.

The inaugural title was claimed by ART Grand Prix driver Esteban Gutiérrez, having taken the final pole position of the season at Monza to put him out of reach of title rival Robert Wickens. Gutiérrez took five race wins during the season, four of which coming in the higher points-rewarding races held on Saturdays. He also took four further podium finishes en route to a 17-point championship win over Wickens. Wickens eventually ended the season with three victories at Hockenheim, Spa-Francorchamps – despite spinning in wet conditions and damaging the nose of his Status Grand Prix car against the pit wall – and Monza, as well as four second-place finishes, two of which being behind Gutiérrez.

Nico Müller finished in third position for Jenzer Motorsport, taking victories in Valencia and at the Hungaroring. He finished 15 points clear of Gutiérrez's team-mate Alexander Rossi, who took wins from pole position in the sprint races in Barcelona and at the Hungaroring. Rio Haryanto was fifth for Manor Racing, winning in Istanbul from a reverse-grid pole position. Other victories were taken by Status Grand Prix's Daniel Morad at Silverstone, Pål Varhaug won the season-opening race in Barcelona and Adrien Tambay won from 27th on the grid at Spa in a wet/dry race. ART Grand Prix also claimed the teams' championship, having done so at Spa-Francorchamps, finishing 44 points clear of nearest challengers Status Grand Prix, while Jenzer Motorsport finished in third position ahead of Manor Racing.

Teams and drivers
For the first two tests of the season, teams were given numbers in relation to alphabetical order. Thus, Addax were given 1, 2 and 3, with ART receiving 4, 5 and 6, and so forth. However, a "qualifying" session was held at Circuit Paul Ricard on 1 April 2010, where Alexander Rossi ended quickest. With this, ART ran cars 1, 2 and 3 during the season.

ART Grand Prix signed Esteban Gutiérrez, who drove for the team in the 2009 Formula 3 Euro Series. He was joined by Pedro Nunes, who drove in the same series for Manor Motorsport, and former ISR Racing International Formula Master driver Alexander Rossi.

After missing the 2009 racing season, Ivan Lukashevich drove for the Status Grand Prix team. He was joined by the Canadian pairing of Formula Two runner-up Robert Wickens and former Formula BMW USA champion Daniel Morad, who did not have a drive in 2009.

After a podium in the 2009–10 GP2 Asia Series in Abu Dhabi, James Jakes joined Manor Racing. He was joined by Rio Haryanto, the 2009 Formula BMW Pacific champion, and Adrian Quaife-Hobbs, who abandoned his campaign in the Formula 3 Euro Series. Jakes was injured at Hockenheim and was replaced by Auto GP driver Adrien Tambay in Hungary and Belgium. Jakes returned for the season finale at Monza.

Nigel Melker, who drove for MP Motorsport in the 2009 Formula Renault Eurocup signed to drive for RSC Mücke Motorsport. Melker was joined by Renger van der Zande, who finished third in the 2009 British Formula 3 Championship. The third driver at the team was Tobias Hegewald, who moves from Formula Two.

Carlin signed British Formula Renault champion Dean Smith and British Formula Ford runner-up Josef Newgarden to drive full-time for the team. Lucas Foresti, one of the team's current British Formula 3 drivers raced for the team in selected rounds of the series. Foresti missed the Turkish round due to prior British Formula 3 commitments, and was replaced by one of the team's Formula Renault 3.5 drivers, Mikhail Aleshin. Foresti returned for the rounds from Valencia onwards, but would miss the rounds in Hungary and Belgium due to British Formula 3 racing at Spa and Snetterton. Formula 3 Euro Series driver António Félix da Costa stepped in to replace Foresti in Hungary and Belgium.

Pablo Sánchez López stepped up from Italian Formula Three to compete for the Addax Team. Mirko Bortolotti moved across from Formula Two to partner Sánchez López, while Felipe Guimarães completed the team, having contested selected races in Indy Lights.

Michael Christensen, who raced in the 2009 Formula BMW Europe season for Mücke Motorsport, joined MW Arden. Christensen was joined by Miki Monrás, who was fifth in the Formula Renault Eurocup, and Leonardo Cordeiro, the 2009 Formula Three Sudamericana champion.

Simon Trummer, who raced in 2009 in International Formula Master driver for Iris Project, joined Jenzer Motorsport. He was joined by Pål Varhaug, who raced for Jenzer in Formula Master in 2009, and Nico Müller, who raced for Jenzer in the Formula Renault Eurocup and was champion in the Swiss Formula Renault 2.0 series. Trummer was injured at Hockenheim and was replaced by European F3 Open championship leader Marco Barba in Hungary. Trummer returned at Spa.

Doru Sechelariu, 2009 Formula BMW Europe driver for Eifelland Racing drove for Tech 1 Racing. He was joined in Barcelona by two drivers who were dovetailing GP3 commitments with other series. Daniel Juncadella contested the first round at Barcelona, but his main focus was a campaign in the Formula 3 Euro Series. Stefano Coletti combined his Formula Renault 3.5 programme with his GP3 commitments, replacing Juncadella from Turkey onwards. Jean-Éric Vergne's main focus was to win the British Formula 3 Championship, and with Vergne racing at Hockenheim in British Formula 3, he was replaced by ART Grand Prix Formula 3 Euro Series driver Jim Pla in Turkey. Vergne returned for Valencia, but was replaced by Juncadella for Silverstone, as he signed a deal to complete the season in GP3, as well as Euro Series commitments. With Juncadella missing the round in Hungary due to a guest drive in British Formula 3 at Spa, Tech 1 had wished to field their Eurocup Formula Renault driver Arthur Pic at the meeting. However, they fielded just two cars, as they have used up their allotment of five drivers for the season, and did not receive total approval from the other teams for Pic to drive. Juncadella returned at Spa.

Atech CRS GP signed Formula Master graduate Patrick Reiterer and former British Formula 3 racer Oliver Oakes to drive two of their cars. The third was driven by Vittorio Ghirelli, after he stepped down from Team Ghinzani in Italian Formula Three. Reiterer was replaced for the round in Valencia by Formula 3 Euro Series racer Roberto Merhi.

Season
First ever round in GP3 Series began in Catalunya. Qualifying was won by Nigel Melker. Feature race was won by Pål Varhaug and sprint race was taken in top by American driver Alexander Rossi. 
In the second round, at Istanbul, Nigel Melker take again pole position for the feature race. The feature race was won by Esteban Gutiérrez, and Rio Haryanto storms to epic Race 2 victory. Third stop, was in Portimão, taking to 19–20 June, but event was cancelled along with GP2 Series. Then, the battle was reversed on Valencia, and win in Race 1 was taken by Mexican Esteban Gutiérrez, while Nico Müller dominates in Race 2. Fourth round was in Silverstone, second consecutive feature race win for Esteban Gutiérrez. Daniel Morad take victory Race 2 from 2nd on the grid. Fifth round was in Hockenheim, first race was won by Robert Wickens, while Mexican dominates in Race 2. Sixth stop was at the Hungaroring. For the first time, Esteban Gutiérrez doesn't have win in each races. First race was won by Nico Müller, and second was dominated by Alexander Rossi. In seventh stop, at Spa-Francorchamps, there was a lot of rain in first race and the race would be stopped. The winner was Robert Wickens, and in second race there was again rain, and all drivers goes to slicks, except Adrien Tambay, who won from 27th on the grid! Final round, at Monza there was only two title contenders - Esteban Gutiérrez and Robert Wickens. Mexican win in qualifying with victory in Race 1 and fastest lap. He won the title, but in second race, he crashed and the race was over for him. Robert Wickens set the victory and the fastest lap. He crashed in the pit lane, but comfortably last win of the first ever year of GP3 Series.

The car

The first chassis used by the GP3 Series was the GP3/10 built by Dallara, who also produces cars in the championship's sister series GP2. It is equipped with a 6-speed paddle shift gearbox and a four-cylinder 2.0 litre (122 cu in) turbocharged engine with 280 bhp developed by Renault Sport. The chassis used tyres supplied by Pirelli, who would then go on to be the tyre supplier for Formula One and GP2 from 2011.

2010 Schedule
An eight-round calendar was announced on 18 December 2009. On 30 April 2010, it was announced that the series would increase to nine rounds, with a round in support of the  added. With the cancellation of the round in Portimão, the calendar returned to eight rounds.

Results

Championship standings

Drivers' Championship

Teams' Championship

 Drivers who did not finish the race but were classified are marked with †.

See also
 2010 Formula Three Euroseries season
 2010 British Formula 3 season
 2010 Masters of Formula 3

Footnotes

References

External links
 Official website

GP3
GP3 Series seasons
GP3
GP3 Series